The agrarian reforms in Cuba sought to break up large landholdings and redistribute land to those peasants who worked it, to cooperatives, and the state. Laws relating to land reform were implemented in a series of laws passed between 1959 and 1963 after the Cuban Revolution. The Institutio Nacional de Reforma Agraria (INRA)—an agency of the Cuban government responsible to implement the first and second Agrarian Reforms. The agency adapted the Soviet model of organisation—small collectives (Asociación Nacional de Agricultures Pequeños) and large(er) state farms.

First agrarian reform law under Che Guevara
On January 27, 1959, Che Guevara made one of his most significant speeches where he talked about "the social ideas of the rebel army." During this speech, he declared that the main concern of the new Cuban government was "the social justice that land redistribution brings about."

Following the success of the Cuban Revolution, the first wave of land reforms was the first major institutional change. According to  Botella-Rodriguez and Gonzalez-Esteban (2021), the first reforms were implemented in May 1959, which eliminated latifunidos—large scale private ownerships and granted ownership and titles to workers who previously worked on those lands, as well as previously foreign-owned land, especially in the rural areas were nationalised, and exploitative conditions such as paying rent for land were abolished. Additionally, it given that the agriculture sector is a significant driver of Cuba's economy, the state scaled up its direct ownership. Any holdings over these limits were expropriated by the government and either redistributed to peasants in  parcels or held as state-run communes. This caused almost 40% of arable land to be removed from foreign owners and corporations to the state, which then distributed these lands primarily to farmers and agricultural workers. This arrangement gave small peasant farmers limited autonomy, but it all changed in August 1962 when Castro announced that the small cooperatives would be converted to state farmers. Moreover, in instances where government seizes land from small peasants for public use, the small peasants are entitled to compensations. In the case for Cuba, compensations, though wrote into the reforms, were not guaranteed when land titles were liquidised under the state. The law also stipulated that sugar plantations could not be owned by foreigners. For lands taken over compensation was offered in the form of Cuban currency bonds to mature in 20 years at 4.5% interest. Bonds were based on land values as assessed for tax purposes. Lastly, two years into the implementation of the first agrarian land reforms, approximately 58.4 per cent of arable land was privately owned, while 41.6 per cent was under government control, which required a second wave of reforms. Both of these reforms were carried out for the purpose of increasing production, diversifying crop production, and eliminating rural poverty.

Second agrarian reform law 
The second agrarian reforms solidified the centralisation of state farms and nationalisations of land and other natural resources. The second agrarian reforms were introduced in 1963 to further limit the allowable size of private farms—all property holdings over 67 hectares became nationalised. Thus, these reforms allowed for the state farmlands to dominate the agricultural sector—70 per cent of the arable land was under the state control and the government became the largest employer, while 30 per cent was privately owned. As a result, between 80 and 85 per cent of Cuba's land was expropriated. The centralisation of Cuba's economy through farming had advantages—productions of meat, milk, rice, and sugarcane increased exponentially. However, these advancements fell short in meeting the demands of the populous when it comes to root vegetables and fruits. These supply-demand shortages were a direct result of the economic organisation—private farmers used to be the ones to produce these goods. However, as the state centralised agricultural production, the participation of private farmers decreased. As a result of the state's dominant position in agriculture, the first and second agrarian reforms transformed Cuba's natural resource organisation. First, the reforms abolished the latifunidos — Cuba was able to return to pre-colonial way of organising — small farmers, cooperatives style, social and financial services such as the Credit and Services Cooperatives (CSS) developed to support the new way of organising. However, the elimination of one kind of hegemony created another. Although implementing the Soviet model of supply distribution (implementing farming tools and inputs) had positive results in terms of increased the production of large-scale crops such as sugar cane and improved infrastructure, it also led to Cuba's dependent on the Soviet Union. Not only did the biodiversity and environment suffer, but Cuba also grew to be dependent on the Soviet Union for its production and supply inputs, making it vulnerable to external shocks. When the Soviet Bloc collapsed in the 1990s, Cuba had to explore alternative solutions to sustain its production. To fill the gap of production inputs, the state encouraged cooperatives: small farmers using traditional peasant knowledge of production and returning to animal traction, at a lower cost and less damage to the environment. The state implemented the Basic Units of Cooperative Production (UBPCs), which limited the sizes of state farms.

References

See also 

 Agriculture of Cuba
 Economy of Cuba
 Law of Cuba
 Constitution of Cuba

References

External links
Castro's Speech on the Promulgation of the First Agrarian Reform Law 

Aftermath of the Cuban Revolution
Agriculture in Cuba
Cuba
Law of Cuba
Fidel Castro
1958 in Cuba
1959 in Cuba
1960s in Cuba
1970s in Cuba